Living Shangri-La is a mixed-use skyscraper in downtown Vancouver, British Columbia, Canada, and is the tallest building in the city and province. The 62-storey Shangri-La tower contains a 5-star hotel and its offices on the first 15 floors, with condominium apartment units occupying the rest of the tower. The building's podium complex also includes a spa, Urban Fare specialty grocery store, a Vancouver Art Gallery public display, and a curated public sculpture garden. It is the 44th tallest building in Canada.

As part of the development deal, the Coastal Church, built in 1919 and located at the west end of the site, underwent a $4.4million restoration.

Hotel
The Shangri-La Hotel Vancouver is a full-service hotel that is part of the building. It is a member of the Shangri-La Hotels and Resorts chain, and is Shangri-La's first North American property. The hotel occupies floors Ground to 15 with 119 rooms (including a presidential suite on the 15th floor). There is no 4th or 13th floor. The hotel includes 5-star services such as restaurants, shops, and Chi The Spa at Shangri-La.

Residences 
Living Shangri-La also contains 307 residential units, consisting of 234 general live-work homes on floors 16 to 43 and 63 private access residential units on floors 44–60 with three penthouses on floor 61. The condominium units are accessible from the entrance at 1128 West Georgia Street and 1111 Alberni Street.

Construction
During the height of construction activity, 1,000 workers were on site constructing one floor per week. The total cost of this building was near . The tower crane on top of the building was fitted with Christmas lights on November 13, 2007, and was the tallest crane illuminated in Vancouver in 2007.

A windstorm on January 15, 2008, caused loose construction materials to blow off the building and into the streets below. Parked vehicles were damaged by falling plywood, but there were no injuries. The neighbouring Terasen Gas building also sustained damage in the storm. Police closed off West Georgia Street for over twelve hours.

The development was marketed by Bob Rennie of Rennie Marketing Systems.

Cultural references 
The building was featured in the 2010 film Tron: Legacy as the headquarters of the fictional company ENCOM International.

Gallery

See also

List of tallest buildings in Vancouver
List of tallest buildings in British Columbia

References

External links
Official Shangri-La Hotel, Vancouver Website
Skyscrapernews.com article on the Living Shangri-La Tower
Shangri-La - Things you should know about 1111 Alberni street

Skyscrapers in Vancouver
Hotels in Vancouver
Tourism in Vancouver
Condo hotels in Canada
Residential buildings completed in 2009
Shangri-La Hotels and Resorts
Residential skyscrapers in Canada
Skyscraper hotels in Canada
James K. M. Cheng buildings
Skyscraper office buildings in Canada